Petroleum and Natural Gas Regulatory Board (PNGRB) (Hindi : पेट्रोलियम और प्राकृतिक गैस नियामक बोर्ड ) is a statutory body in India, constituted under the act of Parliament of India, namely Petroleum and Natural Gas Regulatory Board Act, 2006. 

Its primary functions include regulation of refining, transportation, distribution, storage, marketing, supply and sale of petroleum products and natural gas.

Composition
Present composition is as follow

 Sanjiv nanadan (chairman)
 Satpal Garg (Member, C&M)
 Dr. S.S. Chahar (Member, Legal)
 S. Rath (Member, I&T)
 Vandana Sharma (Secretary)

References

Energy regulatory authorities
Regulatory agencies of India
Institutions of Petroleum in India
Regulatory boards